The Capital Junior Hockey League is a Junior "B" ice hockey league in Alberta, Canada, sanctioned by Hockey Canada. The league was established in 1972 as the Edmonton Metropolitan Junior Hockey League.

League playoff winners face off against the winners of the other Alberta "B" leagues in the Alberta Provincial Junior B Hockey Championship. The Provincial winner earns the chance to compete for the Western Canadian Junior "B" Crown, the Keystone Cup.

Teams

Champions

1At Provincials as CJHL 2nd rep

See also
 List of ice hockey teams in Alberta

References

External links
CJHL

Ice hockey leagues in Alberta
B
Sports leagues established in 1972
1972 establishments in Alberta